The Vampire is an American silent film drama, directed by Robert G. Vignola, based on the 1897 eponymous poem by Rudyard Kipling. It stars Alice Hollister and Harry F. Millarde. It is generally considered the first recognized film depicting the vamp character, also known as femme fatale.

Plot
Harold Brentwell moves to the city for a new job and meets Sybil, an adventuress. Harold is totally fascinated by Sybil and forgets his fiancée Helen but, actually, Sybil is a vampire who is going to ruin his life. He soon loses his job and becomes an alcoholic. Abandoned by the vamp, desperate and alone, Harold goes to the theater and watches the "Vampire Dance", depicting a man dominated by a beautiful woman who, eventually, takes his life putting the bite on him. Thus Harold understands his weakness and tries to redeem himself.

Cast
 Alice Hollister as Sybil the Vampire
 Harry F. Millarde as Harold Brentwell  
 Marguerite Courtot as Helen
 Henry Hallam as Martin
 Bert French and Alice Eis as the dancers
 Robert G. Vignola (uncredited)

Production

The Vampire was shot in Cliffside Park, New Jersey. It is often cited as the oldest "vamp" movie in existence since earlier pictures like the 1910 short film with the same name starring Margarita Fischer and produced by William Nicholas Selig is considered lost.

The highlight of the production is the presence of dancers Alice Eis and Bert French performing their "Vampire Dance", inspired by Philip Burne-Jones painting The Vampire (1897). A still of the performance recreates the exact features of the painting. "The Vampire Dance" was famous and controversial at the time in the American vaudeville circuit for its provocative poses, before it was documented as part of the film.

On February 20, 1913 the dancers scandalised authorities with their number "Le rouge et noir" and were arrested on obscenity charges the next day, later freed on $500 bail each. Eis and French were paid $2,000 by the Kalem executives to immortalise the "Vampire Dance".

Reception
The New York Dramatic Mirror wrote: "The acting of Miss Hollister as the adventuress in handling the different situations with the hero stands out. The director has carried detail to a fine point and very artistically. Photography good."

The Moving Picture World stated: "It is well acted and in photography is, for the most part, above criticism."

Preservation status
Previously considered to be a lost film, a print exists in the George Eastman Museum film archive.

See also
Femme fatale
Vampire films

References

External links
 

1913 films
1913 drama films
American silent short films
Silent American drama films
American black-and-white films
Films based on works by Rudyard Kipling
Films directed by Robert G. Vignola
1910s rediscovered films
Films based on poems
Rediscovered American films
1910s American films